If Only My Heart Had a Voice is the twenty-fifth studio album by country music superstar Kenny Rogers. It was Rogers' first album released on the Giant Records label. However, Rogers had been signed with its parent company, WEA, since 1989. The album was Rogers' first since 1976 not to chart. The album includes the singles "Missing You", "Ol' Red" and "Wanderin' Man".

Content
"Ol' Red" was also recorded by George Jones on his 1990 album You Oughta Be Here with Me, and would later be a Top 20 hit in 2002 for Blake Shelton from his self-titled debut. "If I Were You", recorded here as a duet with Travis Tritt, was originally cut by The Oak Ridge Boys on their 1991 album Unstoppable, and would later be recorded by Chad Brock as a duet with Mark Wills on Brock's 2000 album Yes!

Critical reception
Rob Theakston of Allmusic rated the album 2.5 out of 5 stars, saying that "there are some moments on here that die-hard fans will enjoy". He thought that the production had "aged well" and that the songs were "surprisingly consistent."

Track listing

Personnel 

 Kenny Rogers – lead vocals, backing vocals
 Larry Butler – keyboards, synthesizers
 Gene Golden – keyboards, synthesizers
 Mike Lawler – keyboards, synthesizers
 Warren Hartman – Hammond B3 organ
 Steve Glassmeyer – acoustic piano
 Randy McCormick – acoustic piano
 Bobby Ogdin – acoustic piano
 Gary Prim – acoustic piano
 Larry Byrom – acoustic guitar, electric guitar
 Chuck Jones – acoustic guitar
 Chris Leuzinger – acoustic guitar, electric guitar, electric sitar
 Tim Mensy – acoustic guitar
 Biff Watson – acoustic guitar, mandolin
 Randy Dorman – electric guitar
 Steve Gibson – electric guitar
 Ricky Harper – electric guitar
 Porter Howell – electric guitar
 Dann Huff – electric guitar
 Brent Rowan – electric guitar
 Sonny Garrish – steel guitar, dobro
 Weldon Myrick – steel guitar, dobro
 Jimmy Carter – bass
 Joe Chemay – bass
 Chuck Jacobs – bass
 Dave Pomeroy – bass
 Glenn Worf – bass
 Bob Wray – bass
 Lynn Hammann – drums
 Paul Leim – drums
 Nigel Olsson – drums, percussion
 James Stroud – drums, percussion
 Lonnie Wilson – drums
 Joe Spivey – fiddle
 Carl Gorodetzky – string arrangements and conductor
 The Nashville String Machine – strings
 Jana King – backing vocals
 Curtis Wright – backing vocals
 Curtis Young – backing vocals
 Travis Tritt – lead vocals on "If I Were You"

Production 
 Producers – Larry Butler and James Stroud
 Recorded by Julian King, Lynn Peterzell and Billy Sherrill.
 Assistant Engineers – Derek Bason, Mark Capps, David Hall, John Hurley, Julian King, Graham Lewis and Darren Smith.
 Recorded at Sound Stage Studios, Soundshop Recording Studios and 16th Avenue Sound (Nashville, TN); The Castle (Franklin, TN); Mesa Recording (Sebastapol, CA).
 Mixed by Lynn Peterzell at 16th Avenue Sound, Sound Stage Studios and Masterfonics (Nashville, TN).
 Mastered by Glenn Meadows at Masterfonics 
 Art Direction – Laura LiPuma Nash
 Design – Beth Middleworth
 Photography – Peter Nash
 Management – Ken Kragen at Kragen & Co.
 Booking – C.K. Spurlock

References

Kenny Rogers albums
1993 albums
Giant Records (Warner) albums
Albums produced by Larry Butler (producer)
Albums produced by James Stroud